"The Thing about Ghost Stories" is a 2018 fantasy short story by Naomi Kritzer. It was first published in Uncanny Magazine.

Synopsis

Leah is a folklorist studying ghost stories, who gradually becomes aware that she may be living in one herself.

Reception

"The Thing about Ghost Stories" was a finalist for the 2019 Hugo Award for Best Novelette.

At Tor.com, Katharine Duckett lauded Kritzer's portrayal of the parallels between ghost stories and living with a dementia patient, as well as of Leah's "instantly engaging voice".

References

External links
Text of the story

Works originally published in online magazines
2018 short stories